Mordellistena annuligaster is a beetle in the family Mordellidae. It was described as a nomen novum by Maurice Pic in 1936 based on material from Sumatra, Indonesia.

References

annuligaster
Beetles of Asia
Insects of Indonesia
Fauna of Sumatra
Beetles described in 1936
Taxa named by Maurice Pic